Chirala mandal is one of the 25 mandals in Bapatla district of the Indian state of Andhra Pradesh. It is administered under Ongole revenue division and its headquarters are located at Chirala. The mandal is situated at the shore of Bay of Bengal and is bounded by Parchur, Karamchedu and Vetapalem mandals.

Towns and villages 

 census, the mandal has 5 settlements. It includes 2 towns and 3 villages. Chirala is the municipality and its adjoining area was classified as a census town with the same name.

Note:
M: Municipality, CT: Census town, OG: Out Growth

See also 
Prakasam district

References

Mandals in Prakasam district